The women's shot put event  at the 1994 European Athletics Indoor Championships was held in Palais Omnisports de Paris-Bercy on 13 March.

Results

References

Final results

Shot put at the European Athletics Indoor Championships
Shot
1994 in women's athletics